Tommy Paul and Peter Polansky were the defending champions but chose not to defend their title.

Maxime Cressy and Bernardo Saraiva won the title after defeating Robert Galloway and Nathaniel Lammons 7–5, 7–6(7–3) in the final.

Seeds

Draw

References

External links
 Main draw

Columbus Challenger - Doubles
Columbus Challenger